Robb is a surname of Scottish origin, formed from a diminution (reduction) of the name Robert. Robert was a popular name, especially after its use by three Scots Kings in the fourteenth century. Rob is first recorded as a surname in the mid-15th century, with a handful of individuals recorded in the decades either side of 1500.   As the 16th century progressed there were early groupings in Aberdeenshire, Lanarkshire and later in Perthshire/Stirlingshire. It is likely that the name originated with the offspring of a Robert or Rob, when surnames began to flourish, but unlike some surnames there is no one source for the name.

The surname was originally spelled Rob, sometimes Robe, but by 1800 the vast majority of families had added an extra 'b', an exception being a wealthy farming family of Perthshire origin that settled in Thirsk, Yorkshire.

Although the surname originates in Scotland, Protestant branches of the family settled in Ireland during the sixteenth century Plantations, with the earliest record of the name appearing in the 1630s. The Robb of Timpany family originated with one James Robb who in the late seventeenth century was said to have been a chief mason of the King's Works in Ireland and an assistant of Inigo Jones. A descendant Captain James Robb built Timpany House in 1780. Another armorial Robb family used the surname Robe, descending from Reverend James Robe of Kilsyth (1688–1753), son of Reverend Michael Rob of Cumbernauld (1645–1721), although their coat of arms recorded with the Lord Lyon descends from the Hamilton family through marriage. The Robb crest shows a bare arm holding a chapeau surrounded with a laurel wreath.

It appears that many Robbs emigrated to the New World from Ireland, rather than Scotland.  The surname sometimes became Raab, presumably through the pronunciation, although many Robbs in the New World are originally Raubs of German origin. Amongst many Scottish settlers, there were three Jacobite soldiers (from Angus and Midlothian) transported to America following the Jacobite rising of 1715, and the first Free Kirk Minister to settle in Canada was the Rev. Ralph Robb (1800–1850) a native of Logie parish near Stirling.

The name is often recorded as a sept of the Clan MacFarlane who were based historically on the eastern side of Loch Lomond, but this only stems from an early inclusion of the surname MacRobb, (which is a Highland surname), as a MacFarlane sept. It is unlikely there was ever a link between the, largely, lowland surname and the highland clan.

It is the 192nd (equal) most popular surname in Scotland, judging by births, marriages and deaths in 2018.

People with the surname Robb
 Alfred Robb (1873–1935), English physicist
 Andrew Robb (born 1951), Australian politician
 AnnaSophia Robb (born 1993), American actress, model, and singer
 Bruce Robb (born 1954), American record producer
 Candace Robb (born 1959), American author
 Carole Robb (born 1943), Scottish painter
 Chuck Robb (born 1939), American politician
 Curtis Robb (born 1972), British middle distance athlete
 David Robb (born 1947), British actor
 Douglas Robb (schoolmaster) (born 1970), British rugby player and headmaster 
 Ed Robb (born 1942), American politician
 George Douglas Robb (1899–1974), New Zealand surgeon
George Robb (1926-2011) English football player
 Graham Robb (born 1958), British author
 Ian Robb, English folk singer
 Isabel Hampton Robb (1860–1910), American nursing theorist
 J. Hampden Robb (1846–1911), New York politician
 James Robb (disambiguation), several people
 John Robb (disambiguation), several people
 Lynda Bird Johnson Robb (born 1944), elder daughter of American president Lyndon Baines Johnson
 Mary Lee Robb (1926-2006), American actress
 Mervyn Robb (born 1981)
 Muriel Robb (1878–1907), British tennis player
 Natalie J. Robb (born 1974), Scottish actress
Noël Robb (1913-2009), South African activist
 Paul Robb, musician
 Peter Robb (disambiguation), several people
 R. C. Robb, British athlete at the 1908 Summer Olympics
 Rafael Robb (born 1950), American economist
 Ralph Robb (1800–1850), Scottish clergyman
 Richard Robb FRSE (1901-1977) Scottish statistician and athlete in the 1928 Olympics
 Steven Robb (born 1982), Scottish footballer
 Thomas Robb (born 1946), Ku Klux Klan director
 Nicholas Robb (born 1957) Senior Policy Advisor to the British Government in Westminster, Department for Business Energy & Industrial Strategy during the 2020-2021 pandemic

See also
 Rob (disambiguation)

References

English-language surnames
Scottish surnames